Transit was the second collaborative album between keyboardist Ira Stein and oboist Russel Walder, released in 1986 by Windham Hill.

Track listing

Reception
Keyboard described the album as "generally wishful, sometimes impassioned but never anguished" but wanted the album to have "more adventure in the chord progressions." Meanwhile, Billboard praised the album, even comparing “The Underground” to Tangerine Dream.

References

1986 albums
Electronic albums by American artists
Jazz albums by American artists
Instrumental albums
Collaborative albums
Windham Hill Records albums